Jacques Hiron (born 1946) is a former merchant turned journalist, and writer of popular science, fiction and graphic novels.

He lives in Leucate in southern France.

Works

Fiction/novels 
 Le Paquebots des Sables. E-dite, Paris, 2002,  ISBN 2- 84608-071-2.

Popular science 
 Nöel Hautemanière and Jacques Hiron: Leucate : plein cadre; livre de photographies (Leucate: Full Size; Photo Album). Toreilles, 2004, .
 Jacques Hiron: Il était une fois Leucate (Once Upon a Time There was Leucate). Leucate,  Edition du Cap Leucate, 2005 (first ed. 1998 ).

Graphic novels 
 La Foire aux frisés (The Curly Heads' Fair),  Jean-Michel Arroyo (graphics), Jacques Hiron (script), 2003, .
 The scenario of the comic trilogy  Le Paquebot des sables (bande dessinée) based on his novel Le Paquebot des Sables (dessins/designs by Jean-Michel Arroyo)
 Le Paquebot des sables, tome 1 : Karl, 2004, 
 Le Paquebot des sables, Tome 2 : Ingrid, 2005, 
 Le Paquebot des sables, Tome 3 : Günther, 2006, 

1946 births
Living people
People from Eure
21st-century French novelists
French comics writers
French male novelists
21st-century French male writers